Jens Morgan Dantorp (born 28 April 1989) is a Swedish professional golfer who plays on the European Tour and the Challenge Tour. He has won three times on the  Challenge Tour.

Professional career
Dantorp turned professional in 2008 and played on the Nordic Golf League, winning eight times between 2008 and 2012. He won four tournaments in 2011 and topped the Order of Merit.

Dantorp played on the Challenge Tour in 2012 and 2013, picking up his first win in August 2013 at the Rolex Trophy. At the end of 2013 he qualified for the main tour in 2014. 2014 was a disappointing season and he returned to the Challenge Tour in 2015.

Dantorp finished runner-up in the 2015 Kärnten Golf Open and finished 24th in the Challenge Tour Order of Merit. He also tied for 3rd place in the 2015 Nordea Masters on the European Tour, one of only two appearances he made on the tour during the season. On the 2016 Challenge Tour he was runner-up in the season-ending NBO Golf Classic Grand Final and finished 19th in the Order of Merit. In 2017 he won the Ras Al Khaimah Golf Challenge with an eagle 3 at the first playoff hole and finished tied for 5th place in the NBO Golf Classic Grand Final the following week, to end the season 11th in the Order of Merit and gain a place on the European Tour for 2018.

In July 2018 Dantorp led after three rounds of the Aberdeen Standard Investments Scottish Open, eventually finishing tied for third place and earning a spot in the 2018 Open Championship. 

Dantorp was tied for second, one stroke off the lead, heading into the final round at the 2022 Cazoo Classic in England. He shot a final day 73 to finish in tied 8th place, four strokes behind winner Richie Ramsay.

Professional wins (12)

Challenge Tour wins (3)

Challenge Tour playoff record (1–0)

Nordic Golf League wins (8)

Hi5 Pro Tour wins (1)

Results in major championships

CUT = missed the half-way cut
"T" indicates a tie for a place

Team appearances
Amateur
European Boys' Team Championship (representing Sweden): 2007

See also
2013 European Tour Qualifying School graduates
2017 Challenge Tour graduates
2022 Challenge Tour graduates

References

External links

Swedish male golfers
European Tour golfers
Sportspeople from Malmö
1989 births
Living people